Naoum Aronson (1872–1943) was a sculptor who lived for most of his life in Paris.  He is known principally for his busts of important leaders, including Ludwig van Beethoven, Louis Pasteur, Leo Tolstoy, Grigori Rasputin, and Vladimir Lenin.

Biography
Aronson was born to a Jewish family in Krāslava, in the Vitebsk Governorate of the Russian Empire (present-day Latvia) in 1872.  He studied art at the Vilna Art School before moving to Paris, where he would live for 50 years.  He maintained six galleries in Paris, but kept his prize pieces, including the bust of Rasputin, in his Montparnasse studio.  After the German invasion of France in 1940, he was forced to flee the country.  When he arrived in New York City as a refugee in March 1941 aboard the Serpa Pinto, he had little more than some photographs of the sculptures that he had left behind in France.  He died two years later in his Upper West Side studio at the age of 71.

Selected works

External links

 ArtGiverny article with more biographical information and images of Aronson and his works, some of which are from the archives of the United States Holocaust Memorial Museum
 U.S. Holocaust Memorial Museum archives website has several photographs related to Aronson
Russian Wikisource article  with images of sculptures
Russian Wikipedia article  with more biographical information

References

1872 births
1943 deaths
People from Krāslava
People from Dvinsky Uyezd
19th-century Latvian Jews
Emigrants from the Russian Empire to France
Sculptors from the Russian Empire
19th-century male artists from the Russian Empire
20th-century Russian sculptors
20th-century Russian male artists
Russian male sculptors
French emigrants to the United States
20th-century French sculptors
19th-century French sculptors
French male sculptors
19th-century French male artists